Rao Sahib Abraham Pandithar (2 August 1859 – 31 August 1919) was a Tamil musicologist, composer, doctor and a traditional medicine practitioner from Sambavar Vadakarai of Tirunelveli District (Then Kollam district), who is celebrated for his patronage of numerous Tamil musicians and his influential studies concerning the origins and evolution of traditional Tamil music.

Biography
Abraham Pandithar was born in Sambavar Vadakarai near Surandai in Tirunelveli district to a Tamil Christian Nadar family, the son of Muthusamy Pandithar and Annammal of the Pandithar Maruthuvar caste. He studied at the CVES Normal Teachers Training School at Dindigal and in 1876, became a teacher in the same college. He belonged to a family of doctors and became interested in Siddha medicine.

In 1879, he went to Suruli hills to research herbs growing there. There he met the Siddhar Karunandhar and became his student. After completing his studies he went to Tanjore and worked as a Tamil teacher in Lady Napier Girls School. His wife Gnanavadivu Ponnammal  was the headmistress in the same school. In 1890, he left his teaching job to do research on medicine full-time. He started a farm outside Tanjore for growing medicinal plants. He named it Karanandhapuram after his teacher. It was called as Pandithar thottam (Pandithar's farm) by the locals. He also started a clinic - the  Karunanidhi Medical Hall at his residence in Tanjore. In 1909, the colonial government awarded him the "Pandithar" and "Rao Sahib" title. In 1911, Gnanavadivu died and Pandithar married Bhagyammal.

The publication of Silapathikaram by U. V. Swaminatha Iyer in 1892, made Pandithar interested in Tamil music and he started studying it. He learnt traditional music due to his interest in sangam poetry , from Sadayandi Bhattar and western classical music from Tanjore A. G. Pichaimuthu pillai. He did extensive research on the origins and form of Tamil music. He established the Sangeetha Vidhyalaya Mahajana Sangam - a music association and organised six music conferences during 1912–1914. In 1917, he published his research into Tamil music as Karunamirdha Sagaram, a 1346-page book, that remains a seminal work in the field till today. He also published Karunamirdha Sagara Thirattu - a collection of Tamil practice songs (musicians of that period trained using Telugu songs). He also translated several Keerthanais into Tamil. He attended the All India Music Conference held at Baroda in 1916 and presented his research there.

Death 
Pandithar died in on 31 August 1919.

Descendants 
His family continued his research -  His son Varaguna Pandiyan Pandithar wrote the Tamil musical research work Paanarkaivazhi and his daughter Maragathavalli Duraipandian Pandithar completed part 2 of Karunamirdha Sagaram. His grandson D. A. Thanapandian Pandithar is also a musician and musicologist.  In 2008, the Government of Tamil Nadu nationalised his works.

References

Further reading & Notes

https://www.geni.com/people/Muthusami-Nadar/6000000008627514175 (father of Abraham Pandithar)
https://www.geni.com/people/Annammal-Nadar/6000000008627640598 (mother of Abraham Pandithar)
Kareem, C.K (1976). Kerala District Gazetteers: Palghat. printed by the Superintendent of Govt. Presses. p. 188. Retrieved 2011-06-24.
Kooiman, Dick (1996). "Who is to benefit from missionary education? Travancore in the 1930s". In Bickers, Robert A.; Seton, Rosemary E.. Missionary Encounters: Sources & Issues. Routledge. p. 158. .

External links
http://www.indian-heritage.org/music/garlanda.htm
Biography of Abraham Pandithar
https://www.geni.com/people/Muthusami-Nadar/6000000008627514175 (father)
https://www.geni.com/people/Annammal-Nadar/6000000008627640598 (mother)

1859 births
1919 deaths
Tamil scholars
Tamil musicians
Indian musicologists
20th-century Indian musicians